Ingeborg Hovland (born 3 October 1969) is a former Norwegian footballer who played as a goalkeeper for Klepp IL of the Toppserien. With the Norway women's national team, Hovland was an alternate for the 1999 FIFA Women's World Cup and won an Olympic gold medal in 2000. She was named in Norway's squad for the 1997 and 2001 editions of the UEFA Women's Championship, as an understudy to Bente Nordby.

Hovland scored twice in 512 games for Klepp. As of 2012 she was leading the club's all-time appearance list. During her football career she was employed as a civil engineer.

References

External links
 
 Norwegian national team profile 
 

1969 births
Living people
Norwegian women's footballers
Footballers at the 2000 Summer Olympics
Olympic footballers of Norway
Olympic gold medalists for Norway
Olympic medalists in football
Toppserien players
Klepp IL players
Norway women's international footballers
Women's association football goalkeepers
Medalists at the 2000 Summer Olympics